Με την αγάπη (With Love) is the debut EP by Craig Owens, vocalist for Chiodos and Cinematic Sunrise. It was released September 15, 2009, via Equal Vision Records.

In December 2008, Craig Owens posted a cover of the Counting Crows song "Anna Begins" for download on his website iamcraigowens.com, as well as a demo of Edgar Allan Poe's 'El Dorado'.

Owens announced the name of his new solo EP via Twitter, "Με την αγάπη" which is, loosely translated, Greek for "with love" and is pronounced "meh teen ah-ga-pee" in English. On July 21, 2009, Craig Owens announced on Twitter that he will be releasing the EP on September 15, 2009.

Track listing

Personnel
Craig Owens - lead and backing vocals, piano, acoustic guitars
Brian Southall - electric, acoustic, bass guitars, drums, programming, percussion and backing vocals
Stephen Christian - vocals on "Products of Poverty"

2009 albums